Fine papers are printing and writing paper grades based mainly on chemical pulps. Normally the content of mechanical pulps are below 10% and the amount of fillers in the range 5–25%.

Production

Fine papers are normally surface sized or pigmented with calcium carbonate. Uncoated fine papers are calendered in the paper machine.

Types
Bible paper
Coated fine paper
Inkjet paper
Thermal paper
Woodfree uncoated paper

References

Paper